Maurya is a 2004 Kannada language sports drama film directed by S. Narayan. The film starred Puneeth Rajkumar, Roja Selvamani and Meera Jasmine in lead roles. This film is produced by Rockline Venkatesh. It is the remake of 2003 Telugu movie, Amma Nanna O Tamila Ammayi.

Plot 
Manu's entire life is about his mother, Meena, a college lecturer. They together live in Bangalore. When Manu was a child, he was separated from his father/Meena's husband, Prathap. Manu is a passionate and great kick-boxer, where he later meets Alamelu "Andra", a Telugu girl from Andhra Pradesh and starts to fall in love with her. Manu's happy life is suddenly jolted when Meena dies of a heart attack. On her deathbed, Meena tells Manu to meet Prathap, who was a kickboxing champion that won the championship six times in a row and is presently a kickboxing coach. Manu reluctantly accepts.

When Manu meets Prathap, he learns that he has another wife and a daughter, and also is happily settled with them. Manu gets a job as a janitor and juice provider at his father's kickboxing academy. Anand is Prathap's best student, and he is sure that Anand will win the championship. Later, Manu finds out that Anand had impregnated his step-sister and abandoned her, and also abandons Prathap by getting another master and other sponsors. Prathap is attacked by several of Anand's sponsors, where Manu later beats them up, making Prathap learn that Manu is a great kick-boxer. Prathap also finds out that Manu was also participating in the kick-boxing championship. The rest of the story is about how Prathap trains Manu and wins the championship.

Cast

 Puneeth Rajkumar as Manu
 Roja as Meena
 Meera Jasmine as Alamelu 
 Devaraj as Prathap 
 Rekha Kumar
 Komal
 Doddanna
 Mandya Jayaram 
 Shobaraj
Jaidev as Anand 
Maithreyi Karthik 
Vijaya Sarathi 
Sundar Raj 
Ashok 
Jayalakshmi 
Kote Prabhakar 
Mukhyamantri Chandru
Yathi Raj 
Aiyappa M.M
V. K. Mohan 
Bank Suresh 
Bhanu Prakash 
Sridhar Raj 
Venkatesh Prasad

Production

Soundtrack

The music of the film was composed by Gurukiran.

Reception 
S. N. Deepak of Deccan Herald felt the film had "all essential ingredients like sentiments, action, romance and comedy" to make it "appealing." He added, "Cinematography is good. Dialogues, written by S Narayan, are catchy." Of the acting performances, he wrote, "Meera Jasmine, as an innocent Telugu speaking girl, has put in a good effort. Devaraj and Roja, as parents, suit their roles well", and praise the music on the film.

Box office
The film successfully ran for 100 days in 16 centers of Karnataka and was the fourth continuous 100-day run of a film for Puneeth Rajkumar.

References

External links
 

2004 films
2000s Kannada-language films
Films scored by Gurukiran
Kannada remakes of Telugu films
Films directed by S. Narayan
Indian sports comedy-drama films
Indian boxing films
Rockline Entertainments films
2000s masala films
Films set in universities and colleges
2000s sports comedy-drama films